Thomas Coburn may refer to:

Thomas B. Coburn, president of Naropa University
Tom Coburn (1948–2020), U.S. Senator from Oklahoma